The following is a list of the largest passenger vehicles with consumer availability in history.

Overall

Aircraft

Heavier-than air

Rail

Unit (carriage)

Road

See also
Transport
History of transport
Road train#World's longest road trains for road freight
Dragon Park Ha Long largest aerial lift
List of largest machines

References

Transport-related lists of superlatives
Largest things by volume